Artur Guilherme Moraes Gusmão (born 25 January 1981) is a former Brazilian professional footballer who played as a goalkeeper.

Club career

Brazil
Artur Moraes started his career at Paulista. In 2003, he was loaned – and later signed – to Cruzeiro. For the 2006 and 2007 seasons, he was loaned to Coritiba. He became first-choice goalkeeper in the 2006 season, ahead Kleber and Rodrigo. In the 2007 season, however, Édson Bastos became first choice.

Italy
On 4 January 2008, Artur Moraes signed a two-year contract with Italian club Siena after his contract with Cruzeiro had expired. On 30 January, he was loaned to Cesena.

On 25 June 2008, Artur Moraes completed a transfer to Roma from Siena with his teammate Simone Loria in an exchange deal which had Roma goalkeeper Gianluca Curci move to Siena in a co-ownership deal and Roma midfielder Ahmed Barusso loaned to the Tuscan-based club. Daniele Galloppa, previously co-owned by Roma and Siena, became in effect a Siena player as part of the deal. Artur Moraes made his unofficial debut in Roma's first pre-season friendly of the 2008–09 season, a 3–1 defeat to Steaua București.

In April 2009, he became temporary first-choice after an injury to starter Doni, edging ahead of Júlio Sérgio and Pietro Pipolo. In the 2009–10 season, however, Artur Moraes was dropped, as the coach preferred Júlio Sérgio as first-choice, with Bogdan Lobonț and Doni his back-ups.

Portugal

Braga
In the summer 2010, Artur Moraes left for Portuguese side Braga, as the club had recently lost starter Eduardo and back-up Paweł Kieszek. Artur Moraes initially served as the backup to Mário Felgueiras as the 2010–11 UEFA Champions League third qualifying round, as new signing Quim was out injured. Artur then became Felipe's understudy, ahead of third-choice Marcos. After Felipe returned to Brazil in December, Artur became the first choice.

Benfica
On 16 May 2011, Artur Moraes signed a four-year deal with Benfica. He played consistently throughout his first season with Benfica, earning the nickname "King Artur".

In the 2012–13 season, Artur Moraes' performances worsened with various mistakes against Porto, Estoril and in the Portuguese Cup final defeat to Vitória de Guimarães. Despite this, manager Jorge Jesus maintained his confidence on him.

After a string of mistakes midway through the 2013–14 campaign, Jorge Jesus dropped him in favour of Jan Oblak, and the latter went on to keep several clean sheets in his first starts, notably in a 2–0 home win against Porto. He ended the season in the bench, and was told to look for a new club.

After Oblak's departure to Atlético Madrid, Artur Moraes regained his place in the starting XI in the Supertaça Cândido de Oliveira, being an important part in the victory over Rio Ave, saving three penalties in the shootout. On 31 August 2014, in a Lisbon derby, Artur Moraes erred by giving the ball away to Sporting Clube de Portugal striker Islam Slimani, who scored the equalizer. On 16 September 2014, in the first matchday of the 2014–15 Champions League group stage, against Zenit Saint Petersburg he was sent off in the 18th minute for a professional foul on Danny outside of the box. On 30 June 2015, he left Benfica as his contract expired.

Osmanlıspor / Chapecoense
On 11 July 2015, Artur Moraes signed a two-year contract with Turkish club Osmanlıspor. On 19 January 2017, he returned to Brazil and signed a one-year contract with Chapecoense.

Club statistics

Honours
Paulista
Campeonato Brasileiro Série C: 2001

Cruzeiro
Campeonato Brasileiro Série A: 2003
Copa do Brasil: 2003
Campeonato Mineiro: 2003, 2004

Coritiba
Campeonato Brasileiro Série B: 2007

Braga
UEFA Europa League: Runner-up 2010–11

Benfica
Primeira Liga: 2013–14, 2014–15
Taça de Portugal: 2013–14
Taça da Liga: 2011–12, 2013–14, 2014–15
Supertaça Cândido de Oliveira: 2014
UEFA Europa League: Runner-up 2012–13, 2013–14

Chapecoense
Campeonato Catarinense: 2017

References

External links

 
 
 

1981 births
Living people
Brazilian footballers
Brazilian expatriate footballers
Associação Chapecoense de Futebol players
Cruzeiro Esporte Clube players
Coritiba Foot Ball Club players
A.C.N. Siena 1904 players
A.C. Cesena players
A.S. Roma players
S.C. Braga players
S.L. Benfica footballers
C.D. Aves players
Campeonato Brasileiro Série A players
Campeonato Brasileiro Série B players
Serie A players
Serie B players
Primeira Liga players
Süper Lig players
Expatriate footballers in Italy
Expatriate footballers in Portugal
Expatriate footballers in Turkey
Association football goalkeepers
Footballers from São Paulo (state)
Brazilian expatriate sportspeople in Italy
Brazilian expatriate sportspeople in Portugal
People from Leme, São Paulo